"Heart of Passion" is a song by J.M. Silk taken from the album Hold on to Your Dream, which was released on RCA Records, in 1987.

The composition was written by Keith Nunnally and Steve "Silk" Hurley. B-side of the single featured Isaac Hayes' song "I Can't Turn Around (originally recorded for his 1975 album) that topped the US Dance chart, as well as charted in UK at number sixty-two.

Credits and personnel
Keith Nunnally - lead vocal, writer
Steve Hurley - writer, producer, mix
Larry Sturm - engineer, mix
Phil Balsano - producer

"I Can't Turn Around"
Steve Hurley - producer
Isaac Hayes - writer
Matt Warren - mix

Official versions
"Heart of Passion (Album Version)" - 4:15

See also
List of artists who reached number one on the US Dance chart

References

External links
 [ Steve "Silk" Hurley] on AllMusic
 [ J.M. Silk] on AllMusic

1986 songs
1987 singles
Steve "Silk" Hurley songs
Songs written by Steve "Silk" Hurley
Songs written by Keith Nunnally
RCA Records singles